Kenny Simpson (born April 12, 1960) is an American professional basketball player.

References

External links
 ACB liga Profile 
 Basketball-reference.com Profile
 Sport-reference.com Profile
 REALGM Profile

1960 births
Living people
American expatriate basketball people in Spain
American men's basketball players
Basketball players from Shreveport, Louisiana
Bàsquet Manresa players
Fair Park High School alumni
FC Barcelona Bàsquet players
Grambling State Tigers men's basketball players
Kansas City Kings draft picks
Small forwards